Lithosticta is a monotypic genus of Australian damselflies belonging to the family Isostictidae.
The single species of this genus, Lithosticta macra,
commonly known as a rock narrow-wing, 
is endemic to Arnhem Land in Northern Territory, where it inhabits streams and rivers.

Gallery

References

Isostictidae
Zygoptera genera
Monotypic Odonata genera
Odonata of Australia
Endemic fauna of Australia
Taxa named by J.A.L. (Tony) Watson
Insects described in 1991
Damselflies